The 1948 Arizona Wildcats football team represented the University of Arizona in the Border Conference during the 1948 college football season. The team captains were Harry Varner and Art Converse. The team played its home games in Arizona Stadium in Tucson, Arizona.

Schedule

References

Arizona
Arizona Wildcats football seasons
Arizona Wildcats football